Bruno Magli is an Italian luxury house that specializes in shoes and leather goods for men and women.

History
Founded in 1936, siblings Marino, Mario and Bruno started a small business in the basement of their home in Bologna, Italy, after learning the art of shoemaking from their grandfather. The trio began to accept contract work until the first Magli Shoe Factory (Calzaturificio Magli) was established later that same year.

In 1947 shortly after World War Two, the company built their first manufacturing facility.

In 1969, the company moved to a more modern factory in Bologna.

From the 1980s onwards, the Magli company opened over forty retail stores located throughout the United States, Australia, China and Europe.

Acquisitions

In 2001, the Luxembourg-based investment fund Opera, half-owned by Bulgari, acquired a controlling interest in Bruno Magli. In 2007 Opera sold the brand to UK private equity fund Fortelus Capital, and in 2014, the Swiss fund Da Vinci Invest acquired the brand.

In January 2015, Marquee Brands announced its acquisition of the Bruno Magli brand and related intellectual property assets from Bruno Magli S.p.A. Marquee Brands, a brand acquisition, licensing and development company, was launched by the private equity group Neuberger Berman in September 2014.

The luxury brand corporate office is now headquartered out of Marquee's New York City offices but its products will continue to be designed and produced in Italy.

The shoes were a major component of the O.J. Simpson trial.

References

External links
Bruno Magli official site

1930 establishments in Italy
Manufacturing companies based in Bologna
Culture in Bologna
Design companies established in 1930
Shoe companies of Italy
Italian brands